Sar Khareh-ye Sofla (also Romanized as Sar Khareh-ye Soflá and Sarkharreh Soflá; also known as Sar Khowr, Sar Khowrreh, and Sarkhurreh) is a village in Cham Khalaf-e Isa Rural District, Cham Khalaf-e Isa District, Hendijan County, Khuzestan Province, Iran. At the 2006 census, its population was 154, in 27 families.

References 

Populated places in Hendijan County